Elective surgery or elective procedure (from the , meaning to choose) is surgery that is scheduled in advance because it does not involve a medical emergency.  Semi-elective surgery is a surgery that must be done to preserve the patient's life, but does not need to be performed immediately.

By contrast, an urgent surgery is one that can wait until the patient is medically stable, but should generally be done within 2 days, and an emergency surgery is one that must be performed without delay; the patient has no choice other than immediate surgery if permanent disability or death is to be avoided.

Types
Most surgeries necessary for medical reasons are elective, that is, scheduled at a time to suit the surgeon, hospital, and patient. These include inguinal hernia surgery, cataract surgery, mastectomy for breast cancer, and the donation of a kidney by a living donor.

Elective surgeries include all optional surgeries performed for non-medical reasons. This includes cosmetic surgery, such as facelifts, breast implants, liposuction, and breast reduction, which aim to subjectively improve a patient's physical appearance. LASIK procedures can be elective, where a patient weighs the risks against increased quality of life expectations. LASIK is currently the top elective surgery in the United States.

Preparation

Preoperative carbohydrates may decrease amount of time spent in hospital recovering.

Urgency
When a condition is worsening but has not yet reached the point of a true emergency, surgeons speak of semi-elective surgery: the problem must be dealt with, but a brief delay is not expected to affect the outcome.

In a patient with multiple medical conditions, problems classified as needing semi-elective surgeries may be postponed until emergent conditions have been addressed and the patient is medically stable.  For example, whenever possible, pregnant women typically postpone all elective and semi-elective procedures until after giving birth.  In some situations, an urgently needed surgery will be postponed briefly to permit even more urgent conditions to be addressed.  In other situations, emergency surgery may be performed at the same time as life-saving resuscitation efforts.

Semi-elective procedures are typically scheduled within a time frame deemed appropriate for the patient's condition and disease.  Removal of a malignancy, for example, is usually scheduled as semi-elective surgery, to be performed within a set number of days or weeks. Urgent surgery is typically performed with 48 hours of diagnosis.  Emergency surgery is performed as soon as a surgeon is available.

Many surgeries can be performed as either elective or emergency surgeries, depending on the patient's needs. A sudden worsening of gallbladder disease may require immediate removal of the gallbladder by emergency surgery, but this surgery is more commonly scheduled in advance. An appendectomy is considered emergency surgery, but depending upon how early the diagnosis was made, the patient may have more time before the appendix risks rupturing or the infection spreads. Also, in certain emergency conditions, even ones like a heart attack or stroke, surgery may or may not need to be utilized.

References

Bibliography
 

Medical terminology
Surgery